Prirechny is a rural locality (a settlement) in Krasnooktyabrskoye Rural Settlement of Maykopsky District, Russia. The population was 323 as of 2018. There are 6 streets.

Geography 
Prirechny is located 16 km northwest of Tulsky (the district's administrative centre) by road. Krasnooktyabrsky is the nearest rural locality.

References 

Rural localities in Maykopsky District